Braughing railway station served the village of Braughing, Hertfordshire, England, from 1863 to 1964 on the Buntingford branch line.

History 
The station was opened on 3 July 1863 by the Great Eastern Railway. It was situated in the south side of Station Road, which is on the B1368. On the up platform was the station building and at the north end of the down platform was the signal box that allowed access to the goods yard. This had a goods shed, a siding that served a cattle dock and capacity for 50 wagons. These facilities were withdrawn on 7 September 1964. The station closed on 16 November 1964. The platform and station building still remain. These have been recently rebuilt and maintained.

References 

Disused railway stations in Hertfordshire
Former Great Eastern Railway stations
Beeching closures in England
Railway stations in Great Britain opened in 1863
Railway stations in Great Britain closed in 1964
1863 establishments in England
1964 disestablishments in England
Braughing